The Slovak koruna or Slovak crown (Ks) was the currency of the Nazi-era Slovak Republic between 1939 and 1945. The Slovak koruna replaced the Czechoslovak koruna at par and was replaced by the reconstituted Czechoslovak koruna, again at par.

Initially, the Slovak koruna was at par with the Bohemian and Moravian koruna, with 10 korunas = 1 Reichsmark. It was devalued, on 1 October 1940, to a rate of 11.62 Slovak korunas to one Reichsmark, while the value of the Bohemian and Moravian currency remained unchanged against the Reichsmark.

Coins 
In 1939, coins were introduced in denominations of 10 haliers, 5 and 20 korunas, with 20 and 50 haliers and 1 koruna added in 1940. The 10 and 20 haliers were bronze, the 50 haliers and 1 koruna cupronickel, the 5 korunas nickel and the 20 korunas were silver. In 1942, zinc 5 haliers were introduced and aluminium replaced bronze in the 20 haliers. Aluminium 50 haliers followed in 1943. Silver 10 and 50 korunas were introduced in 1944.

Compared to the pre-war Czechoslovak koruna, the Slovak koruna coins had an additional 50 Ks, the silver content of the 10 and 20 Ks coins was reduced from 700 ‰ to 500 ‰ and all but 5 Ks shrank in physical sizes. The designers were Anton Hám, Andrej Peter, Gejza Angyal, Ladislav Majerský and František Štefunko. Coins were minted in the Kremnica mint.

Banknotes 
In 1939, Czechoslovak notes for 100, 500 and 1000 korún were issued with SLOVENSKÝ ŠTÁT overprinted on them for use in Slovakia. That year also saw the introduction of 10 and 20 koruna notes by the government.

References

Currencies of Slovakia
Currencies introduced in 1939
Modern obsolete currencies